A pop icon is a celebrity, character, or object whose exposure in popular culture is regarded as constituting a defining characteristic of a given society or era. The usage of the term is largely subjective since there are no definitively objective criteria. The categorization is usually associated with elements such as longevity, ubiquity and distinction. Moreover, "pop icon" status is distinguishable from other kinds of notoriety outside pop culture, such as with historic figures. Some historic figures are recognized as having reached "pop icon" status during their era, and such status may continue into the present. Pop icons of previous eras include Benjamin Franklin and Mozart.

Attributes and origins

Marcel Danesi, a professor of semiotics and linguistic anthropology at the University of Toronto cited in Language, Society, and New Media: Sociolinguistics that the word "icon" is a "term of religious origin and used for the first time in celebrity culture to describe the American pop singer Madonna". Following description asserts that the word "is now used in reference to any widely known celebrity, male or female". Some dictionaries around the world such as Oxford Advanced Learner's Dictionary and the Diccionario panhispánico de dudas have included Madonna's name to illustrate the new meaning of "icon".

Longevity
Usually, the pop icon status of a celebrity is contingent upon longevity of notoriety. This is in contrast to cult icons, whose notoriety or recognition may be limited to a specific subculture. Some pop icons have left a lasting and indelible mark in the area of their career, and then went on to attain a lasting place of recognition in society at large.

Ubiquity
A common element of pop icon status is the ubiquity of imagery and allusions to the iconic figure. It is common for the figure to be recognized and even celebrated in areas outside the original source of celebrity status. An example of this is Albert Einstein, a physicist whose image and legacy have been represented in comic strips, T-shirts, greeting cards and many other contexts.

Distinction
Often pop icon status implies distinguished association with a societal ideal or archetype. It is not uncommon for iconic figures to have a nickname or sobriquet that is used to emphasize this association. Sometimes the very name of such individuals is even used as a synonym for common words or ideas.

Some fictional characters, such as Peter Pan, Winnie the Pooh, Mickey Mouse, Bugs Bunny, Tom and Jerry, Snow White, Superman, Batman, Spider-Man, James Bond, Darth Vader, Doctor Who, the Simpsons, Harry Potter, Mary Poppins, Mario, Kermit the Frog, SpongeBob SquarePants, Pikachu, Alice, Willy Wonka, and Sherlock Holmes are regarded as pop icons. Even inanimate objects have been recognized as pop icons.

Some figures attain transitory or context-specific "pop icon" status for particular events that captivate public attention, such as in the case of the O.J. Simpson trial.

See also
 Cultural icon
 Celebrity culture
 Popular culture
 Teen idol
 Horror icon
 Art pop
 Honorific nicknames in popular music

Notes

References

Further reading
 
Cullen, Jim, ed (2001). Popular Culture in American History. UK: Blackwell Publishing. .

Popular culture
Stock characters